Hotel Rats is a 1927 German silent film directed by Jaap Speyer and starring Nils Asther, Ellen Kürti, and Mia Pankau.

Cast

References

Bibliography

External links

1927 films
Films of the Weimar Republic
German silent feature films
Films directed by Jaap Speyer
German black-and-white films